Kari Maurits Takko (born 23 June 1962) is a Finnish former professional ice hockey goaltender. He played in the National Hockey League between 1986 and 1991, and in the Finnish SM-liiga between 1979 and 1985, and again from 1991 to 1997. Internationally Takko played for the Finnish national team at several tournaments, including the 1984 Winter Olympics. He currently works for Porin Ässät  as an assistant to the sports manager. Takko is also the Director of European Scouting for the Dallas Stars.

Playing career 
Takko played six seasons in the NHL, serving as a backup to Don Beaupre, Jon Casey and Bill Ranford. He was selected in the tenth round of the 1981 NHL Entry Draft, 200th overall, by the Quebec Nordiques, but was unable to come to contract terms. He re-entered the 1984 NHL Entry Draft and was this time drafted by the Minnesota North Stars.

Takko started his SM-liiga career in Ässät during the 1978–79 season, and played there for seven seasons (1978–1985). Takko went to the NHL after the 1984–85 season. He was signed by the Minnesota North Stars, and played with them for a total of six seasons (1985–1991). During the 1990–91 season Takko was traded to the Edmonton Oilers for Bruce Bell, making it the "Takko Bell Trade", a play on the fast food restaurant chain. Takko played for the rest of his NHL career in Edmonton. After retiring from NHL play, he played nine more seasons in Europe representing Ässät (1991–1996) in the SM-liiga, and HV71 (1997–2000) in the Elitserien. Takko retired from playing after the 1999–2000 season.

Takko also played internationally for Finland, appearing for their national team a total of 104 times.
He is currently the Director of European Scouting for the Dallas Stars.

Career statistics

Regular season and playoffs

International

Awards 
 Silver medal at the World Junior Championships in 1981.
 Bronze medal at the World Junior Championships in 1982.
 Named Best Goalie of SM-liiga in 1985 and 1994.

References

External links 
 
 HockeyGoalies entry

1962 births
Living people
Ässät players
Dallas Stars scouts
Edmonton Oilers players
Finnish ice hockey goaltenders
HV71 players
Ice hockey players at the 1984 Winter Olympics
Kalamazoo Wings (1974–2000) players
Minnesota North Stars draft picks
Minnesota North Stars players
Olympic ice hockey players of Finland
People from Uusikaupunki
Quebec Nordiques draft picks
Springfield Indians players
Sportspeople from Southwest Finland